Belga Rise was a Belgian automobile manufacturer, based in Haren, Brussels, specializing in luxury cars.

The company produced cars from 1928 to 1935. Initially, it produced cars under license for the French firm Sizaire-Naudin.

Engines used included the 6-cylinder Hotchkiss AMBO and straight-8s by F. N., Minerva, Continental, and Talbot (Darracq). These engines were used with conventional 3-speed and Cotal 4-speed gearboxes. 35 cars were purchased by the Belgian Army for use as staff cars.

References

Further reading

Defunct motor vehicle manufacturers of Belgium
Belgian companies established in 1928
1935 disestablishments in Belgium
Belgian brands
Manufacturing companies based in Brussels
Vehicle manufacturing companies established in 1928
Vehicle manufacturing companies disestablished in 1935